Hampshire Archives and Local Studies holds the archives for the county of Hampshire. The archives are located in Sussex Street, Winchester, and are run by Hampshire County Council.

References

Archives in Hampshire
History of Hampshire
County record offices in England